Rafael Alcayde (19 October 1906 – 27 August 1993) was a Mexican film actor.

Selected filmography
 Kiss and Make-Up (1934)
 I Am a Fugitive (1946)
 Cantaclaro (1946)
 The Associate (1946)
 The Kneeling Goddess (1947)
 Adventures of Casanova (1948)
 The Mark of the Skunk (1950)
 The White Rose (1954)
 Bluebeard (1955)
 Drop the Curtain (1955)
 The New World (1957)
 Ten Days to Tulara (1958)
 The Last of the Fast Guns (1958)
 Villa!! (1958)

References

Bibliography
 Victoria Ruétalo & Dolores Tierney. Latsploitation, Exploitation Cinemas, and Latin America. Routledge, 2009.

External links

Year of birth unknown
Year of death unknown
Mexican male television actors
Mexican male film actors